The minor tetra (Hyphessobrycon minor) is a small fish from the Essequibo River in Guyana in South America, closely resembling its relative, the serpae tetra, from the Amazon and Paraguay. These two very similar species are separated geographically, so they would not interbreed.

References

External links 
 Minor Tetra Fact Sheet

Tetras
Tropical fish
Taxa named by Marion Durbin Ellis
Fish described in 1909